Saint Honore Cake Shop is one of the largest bakery and cake chain stores in Hong Kong. By 2009, it had over 80 outlets in Hong Kong. It is parented by Convenience Retail Asia Limited, the retailing flagship of Li & Fung.

The chain of stores is named in honour of Saint Honoratus of Amiens (Honoré in French), the patron saint of bakers.

History
1972: Saint Honore Cake Shop Limited was established with the first shop set up in Happy Valley, Hong Kong.
1991: It was acquired by Hong Kong Catering Management Limited (formerly Yaohan International Caterers)
1992: It opened its first outlet in Macau.
1993: It established an automated bakery production line in Kowloon Bay.
1995: It established an automated manufacturing plant in Shenzhen.
1997: It was awarded ISO 9001 certificate.
2000: Saint Honore Holdings Limited was listed on the Hong Kong Stock Exchange.
2002: It opened its first outlet in Canton.
2007: It was acquired and privatized by Convenience Retail Asia.

Link
Saint Honore Cake Shop

See others
Convenience Retail Asia
Li & Fung

References

Companies formerly listed on the Hong Kong Stock Exchange
Food and drink companies established in 1973
Bakeries of Hong Kong
Li & Fung
Hong Kong brands
1973 establishments in Hong Kong